United Nations Security Council resolution 1154, adopted unanimously on 2 March 1998, after reaffirming Resolution 687 (1991) and all other relevant resolutions, the Council endorsed a memorandum of understanding signed between the Secretary-General Kofi Annan and the Deputy Prime Minister of Iraq, Tariq Aziz.

Acting under Chapter VII of the United Nations Charter, the Council commended the initiative of the Secretary-General to secure agreements from the Iraqi government on compliance with its obligations under relevant resolutions, and awaited their full implementation. The memorandum established a Special Group consisting of diplomats and members of the United Nations Special Commission (UNSCOM) and International Atomic Energy Agency (IAEA) for the inspection of weapons sites.

The resolution then demanded that Iraq comply with its obligations and allow unconditional and unrestricted access to sites and persons by UNSCOM and IAEA, and that any violation would have severe consequences for the country.

See also
 Foreign relations of Iraq
 Iraq and weapons of mass destruction
 Iraq disarmament timeline 1990–2003
 Sanctions against Iraq
 List of United Nations Security Council Resolutions 1101 to 1200 (1997–1998)

References

External links
 
Text of the Resolution at undocs.org

 1154
 1154
1998 in Iraq
Iraq and weapons of mass destruction
 1154
March 1998 events